Peregrine Bertie DL (ca. 1663 – 10 July 1711) was a British politician, the second son of Robert Bertie, 3rd Earl of Lindsey.

Educated at the Middle Temple in 1679, Bertie first entered the House of Commons in 1685 in Boston, alongside his brother, Lord Willoughby de Eresby, and generally inclined towards the Tories. On 20 June 1685, he was commissioned a cornet in Lord Willoughby's independent troop of horse, raised to suppress the Monmouth Rebellion. In 1689, Bertie did not choose to stand for Parliament, and Sir William Yorke, a Whig, was returned alongside Lord Willoughby. In 1690, when Lord Willoughby was called to the House of Lords by writ of acceleration, Peregrine was returned at the ensuing by-election. However, he now showed leanings towards the Whigs, and solicited his half-uncle's brother-in-law, Hon. Thomas Wharton, to rally Nonconformists on his behalf.

When his younger brother, Norris, died in 1691, he appealed to the King, through his uncle the Marquess of Carmarthen, to obtain Norris' commission as a guidon and major in the 2nd Troop of Horse Guards for himself. Peregrine did not obtain his brother's commission, but was rewarded with a Court appointment in 1692 as Vice-Chamberlain to Queen Mary, after Jack Howe was turned out of office. Despite this, he regularly opposed the administration in Parliament.

He was appointed Vice-Chamberlain of the Household in 1694, perhaps to encourage his loyalty to the Court. Over the next few years, he continued to slowly move into the Whig orbit, and was made a Privy Counsellor in 1695. The attainder of Sir John Fenwick in 1697 placed Bertie under severe political strain. Most of the Bertie family opposed the attainder; while it is unclear exactly what role Peregrine took, his conduct was sufficiently lukewarm to earn the severe displeasure of King William. His office as Vice-Chamberlain was saved through the intercession of Sunderland, the Chamberlain, but the incident appears to have stimulated him to complete his transition from Tory to Whig.

He did not stand for re-election in Boston in 1698, perhaps partly due to tensions with his father, who remained a Tory. However, after his father's death, he returned to Parliament in the December 1701 election with the support of his brother, now Earl of Lindsey. (Lindsey remained a Tory, however.)

In 1706, he exchanged offices with Thomas Coke, receiving the sinecure of a Teller of the Exchequer. Bertie died of apoplexy in 1711.

References

1660s births
1711 deaths
British MPs 1707–1708
British MPs 1708–1710
British MPs 1710–1713
Deputy Lieutenants of Lincolnshire
English army officers
Members of the Parliament of Great Britain for constituencies in Cornwall
Members of the Parliament of Great Britain for English constituencies
Members of the pre-1707 English Parliament for constituencies in Cornwall
Members of the Privy Council of England
Members of the Privy Council of Great Britain
Younger sons of earls
Peregrine
English MPs 1685–1687
English MPs 1690–1695
English MPs 1695–1698
English MPs 1701–1702
English MPs 1702–1705
English MPs 1705–1707